Parviturbo weberi is a species of sea snail, a marine gastropod mollusk in the family Skeneidae.

Description
The size of the shell attains 1.7 mm.

Distribution
This species occurs in the Gulf of Mexico, the Caribbean Sea and the Lesser Antilles; in the Atlantic Ocean off the Bahamas and Brazil at depths up to 60 m.

References

 Rosenberg, G.; Moretzsohn, F.; García, E. F. (2009). Gastropoda (Mollusca) of the Gulf of Mexico, Pp. 579–699 in: Felder, D.L. and D.K. Camp (eds.), Gulf of Mexico–Origins, Waters, and Biota. Texas A&M Press, College Station, Texas. 
 Rubio F., Rolán E. & Fernández-Garcés R. (2015). Revision of the genera Parviturbo and Pseudorbis (Gastropoda, Skeneidae). Iberus. 33(2): 167-259.

External links
 Pilsbry H.A. & McGinty T.L. (1945). "Cyclostrematidae" and Vitrinellidae of Florida. I. Nautilus, 59(1): 1–13, pl. 1–2; II, Nautilus, 59(2): 52–60, pl. 6
 

weberi
Gastropods described in 1945